Porter Ranch is a suburban neighborhood in the northwest San Fernando Valley region of the City of Los Angeles, California.

History

The new home construction that was completed in the Porter Ranch area in the 1990s–2000s, including the Renaissance Summit development, was mired in controversy and Los Angeles politics in the late 1980s and early 1990s. This largely undeveloped area on the very edge of the San Fernando Valley slated for a master-planned $2 billion real estate and commercial development was opposed by the "slow growth" movement, which was gaining traction through a combination of ballot initiatives and court cases along with growing environmental concerns as L.A. at the time was experiencing multiple environmental and infrastructure problems related to the previous decades rapid expansion, in terms of air quality, sewage capacity, and flood control. More locally, this combined with the more "nimby" type sentiment of existing and nearby residents of the Porter Ranch area who feared the increased traffic that would be brought by the planned building of an area commercial complex to service the new homes being built. Developments were also criticized for destroying the natural beauty of the brush and wild areas that inhabited the space before the houses were built.

However, Shapell Homes, a company founded by Nathan Shapell, a major Los Angeles builder, brought together powerful Los Angeles political figures to support the new home building.

Aliso Canyon Bridge
In the late 80s, there was an attempt to connect Sesnon Boulevard, the road that flanks the north side of the neighborhood, to its counterpart across the Aliso Canyon, also named Sesnon, via a bridge to be named simply, the "Aliso Canyon Bridge". This plan never came to fruition due to demonstrations from the residents of Porter Ranch, the primary opponents of the bridge, who believed that connecting the road to the neighborhood across the canyon would bring "crime...drag racing, and drug dealing". Residents were also afraid of Sesnon becoming "a [highway] 118 alternate route", which would "send many cars through Porter Ranch".

Proponents of the bridge said that there was a "critical need" to build a bridge because "the city of Los Angeles has installed heavy-duty guard rails to stop any vehicle that is out of control as it moves east at Beaufait. There is a much smaller rail 200 feet farther east...however, the first guard rail is usually partially broken because of out-of-control vehicles hitting it. Before it can be repaired, there is almost no protection to prevent a vehicle from falling into Aliso Canyon. Additionally, if a vehicle heading west on Sesnon becomes lost, there is no barrier to prevent it from falling into this deep canyon." Despite the proponents' argument about the severity of the situation, the bridge was never built.

There is still evidence of the bridge seen from Sesnon heading east towards the canyon, the road (which is now closed off behind multiple guard rails) is visible heading towards the canyon just short of the bridge, and the counterpart is still visible on the west-bound side.

Aliso Canyon oil well fire
A company of Texas oil well firefighters, headed by the legendary Paul “Red” Adair, came to Oat Mountain and stopped a 1968 blaze after six days.

Gas blowout

On October 23, 2015, Southern California Gas Company workers discovered a leak in one of the over 110 wells at the Aliso Canyon natural gas storage facility, about one mile north of homes in Porter Ranch. The gas blowout began spewing 110,000 pounds of methane per hour. The blowout involved gas stored under pressure in an underground reservoir; the stored gas included mercaptan (tert-Butylthiol), an odorant added to the odorless natural gas to produce a "rotten egg" smell for safety. The California Air Resources Board estimated that the leak increased California's methane gas emissions by 25%.

By order of the Los Angeles County Dept of Health, the company relocated thousands of families from the Porter Ranch area; the Federal Aviation Administration established a temporary flight restriction over the leak site until March 2016.  On December 15, the county of Los Angeles declared a state of emergency, and two days later it approved a plan to close two schools in the area. Officials estimated that the leak would take months to repair.

On January 11, 2016 Mitchell Englander, the LA City Councilman representing Porter Ranch, said "Most people weren't aware that one of the largest gas storage facilities in the United States was in their backyard. There was, from what we're hearing, no disclosure when they bought their homes."

On February 18, 2016, state officials announced that the leak was permanently plugged.

On March 12, 2016, Los Angeles County Public Health Department officials say its test of dust in Porter Ranch homes turned up the presence of metals, including barium, that could have caused the kinds of health symptoms some residents have reported experiencing even after the big gas blowout was plugged.

Fires and other major disasters

Clampette fire
Sept. 25, 1970 this fire made a one-day 20 mile run to the sea in Malibu from Newhall pass. This fire was the most destructive to date both in loss of property and life. One fatality was in Porter Ranch, 4 deaths total. The Porter Ranch death occurred as a homeowner tried to drive up Tampa through the flames to get to his family at the family home above the ridge (near Sesnon). Note that Tampa was abutted by brush on both sides north of Rinadi until you pass the ridge.  It  merged with 2 other fires. Part one of shake and bake. The fire burned along Rinaldi, crossing Rinadi just west of Reseda Blvd. A hill just northeast of Reseda/Renadi was named cherry hill after its grasses caused the hill to glow like a cherry. Part one of shake and bake.

February 9, 1971 Sylmar Quake
This quake had a major impact on Porter Ranch, on the northwest portion along San Fernando Mission Blvd pools were half emptied, many block walls fell over, the area was without running water for a couple of weeks. Many of the homes floor joists were not bolted to the pylons underneath, causing remediation. A major aftershock was on a fault in Porter Ranch. Note: there were no issues with the Aliso Cyn oil field.

December 9, 1988 Brush Fire 
About 5:00 am a brush fire propelled by 70 mph Santa Anna winds crossed Aliso Creek and destroyed 13 homes and damaged 23 mostly on Beaufait Avenue.  The use of wood roof shingles was blamed for the enhanced level of destruction of the fire. Many residents fended off flames on their house roofs with garden hoses. The fire consumed 3,000 acres and $10 million (1988) in damages.

2019 wildfire
On October 10, 2019, the Saddleridge Fire broke out in the nearby community of Sylmar due to an electrical power line short circuit. Despite efforts to control the fire, the blaze spread to Porter Ranch within a few hours, forcing the entire community to evacuate while burning some of the homes in the eastern part of the neighborhood.

Geography
The neighborhood is bounded by Brown's Canyon/Chatsworth on the south and west, Northridge on the south, and Granada Hills on the northeast and east. The Santa Susana Mountains, which separate the San Fernando and Santa Clarita valleys, lie to the north. The principal thoroughfares are Mason Ave., Corbin Ave., Porter Ranch Drive, Tampa Ave. and Reseda Blvd., running north–south, and Sesnon Blvd., Rinaldi St. and the Ronald Reagan Freeway (State Route 118), running east and west. The Porter Ranch ZIP code is 91326.

Porter Ranch is in the hilly northwestern tip of the San Fernando Valley, where, according to a 2008 Los Angeles Times article, it was a "calm outpost of Los Angeles" that attracted residents "seeking sanctuary from the urban hubbub." It was noted that the neighborhood had "some of the cleanest air in the Valley year-around—some of which is attributable to winds that sweep through the community regularly." Nevertheless, "those same winds, which have been clocked at 70 mph, take down trees and holiday lights." * Renaissance Summit is a neighborhood at the highest point of Porter Ranch.

Brief History 1960-1980
Porter Ranch community started as a housing tract in the community of Northridge. This was along San Fernando Mission Blvd west of Reseda Blvd circa 1960–1963. No homes were north of Rinaldi except for a few dozen above "the ridge", where there was a 7/11 which was a destination for determined kids who like to hike or ride bikes up Tampa. These homes were only accessible via Tampa. Approximately 50 homes of the original tract was destroyed north of San Fernando Mission Blvd to build the 118 freeway. 
In the 1970/1971 "shake and bake" three merging fires from Indian Dunes to the Ocean in Malibu, surrounding Simi Valley. The fall 1970 fire crossed Rinaldi west of Reseda Blvd. The largest hill just northeast of Reseda/Rinaldi was thereafter called "cherry hill" as it glowed like a cherry as its tall grasses burned. 
Undeveloped areas south of Rinaldi were substantially feral orange groves, north of Rinaldi was all grasslands. Kids would ride dirt bikes and motorcycles on the many trails in the grasslands and orange groves. Popular with the kids was "the secret of the three trees" visible on top of Oat Mountain. Kids would leave from Rinaldi hiking to the "three trees", the secret was a fourth tree behind out of sight. It was not unusual to have teen parties complete with rock band (using a generator) in the canyon just west of Tampa Ave. It was so safe in the 1970s that kids were often instructed to be in, or at least check in, when the street lights turn on.

Prior to "Devonshire Division" of LAPD, Van Nuys division was the closest station. It was not unusual for police response to be 45 minutes. When the McDonalds on Reseda just north of Devonshire was robbed and an LAPD officer responding was killed. Devonshire Division was opened in a storefront in Granada Hills

Demographics
According to the U.S. Census in 2000, the population was 24,923. Based on the Los Angeles Department of City Planning estimates, the population was 30,571 in 2008.

With a population density of 4,462 people per square mile (1,723/km2), Porter Ranch is among the lowest-density neighborhoods of the city of Los Angeles.

Ethnic makeup
According to Mapping L.A. of the Los Angeles Times, Porter Ranch was "moderately diverse," with a relatively high ratio of Asian and white people in the neighborhood. The figures for 2000 were 60.9% White, 26.8% Asian, 7.5% Latino, 1.8% black and 3.0%  other races.

A total of 8,385 (33.6%) of residents were foreign born, about average for  both the city and the county. Korea (21.4%) and Philippines (9.3%) were the most common foreign places of birth.

Household makeup
Average household size was three people, about the same as the rest of the city and county. Of the housing units in Porter Ranch, 91.8% were occupied by homeowners, while 8.2% were occupied by renters.

Income
The median household income was $121,428 in 2008 dollars, a high figure for the city and the county. In Los Angeles County, Bel-Air, Hidden Hills and Rolling Hills had the most similar household incomes. The percentages of households that earn $60,000 and above were high for the county. Porter Ranch is rated the wealthiest neighborhood in the San Fernando Valley, with Encino ranked second.

Government and infrastructure

Local
Los Angeles Fire Department Station 8 and Station 28 are in the area.

Los Angeles Police Department operates from the nearby Devonshire Police Station.

County, state and federal
Porter Ranch is located in California's 25th congressional district, which is represented by Republican Mike Garcia.

The Los Angeles County Department of Health Services operates the Pacoima Health Center in Pacoima, serving Porter Ranch.

Porter Ranch is located in Los Angeles City Council District 12, currently represented by John Lee. It also is represented by the Porter Ranch Neighborhood Council.

The United States Postal Service Ranch Post Office is located at 19300 Rinaldi Street.

Education
Fifty-one percent of Porter Ranch residents aged 25 and older had earned a four-year degree by 2000, a high percentage for the city.

Schools
Schools within the Porter Ranch boundaries are:

Public
 Castlebay Lane Charter School, 19010 Castlebay Lane
 Porter Ranch Community School, 12450 Mason Avenue

Libraries
Los Angeles Public Library operates a branch library within the community.

Parks and recreation
Palisades Park is an unstaffed park in Porter Ranch. Others include Aliso Canyon Park, Rinaldi Park, Viking Park, Porter Ridge Park, Limekiln Canyon Park, Moonshine Canyon Park, and Holleigh Bernson Memorial Park. Porter Ridge Park was a filming location of the movie E.T. the Extra-Terrestrial (1982). In March 2022, the Los Angeles City Council backed a proposal to officially change the park's name to "E.T. Park" as it is commonly referred to by locals.

Notable people
 Robert M. Wilkinson (1921–2010), Los Angeles City Council member and Porter Ranch lobbyist
 Hal Bernson, Los Angeles City Council member, 1979–2003, when Porter Ranch development was approved
 Lori Nelson (1933-2020), film and TV actress, mostly active in the 1950s and early 60s, died in her Porter Ranch home.
 Tee Grizzley, hip hop artist
 Alex Padilla, United States Senator

See also

References

External links
Porter Ranch Neighborhood Council

 
Communities in the San Fernando Valley
Neighborhoods in Los Angeles
Santa Susana Mountains